The 2006 Hamilton municipal election was held on November 13, 2006, to elect municipal officials in Hamilton, Ontario. Touted by pundits as being one of the closest mayoral races in Hamilton history, the incumbent Larry Di Ianni was defeated by a margin of 452 votes by Fred Eisenberger.

Mayoral Election

Candidates

 Iridology partitioner Diane Elms
 Fringe candidate Steve Leach
 Joke candidate Martin Zuliniak

Michael Baldasaro: Leader of the Church of the Universe and a perennial candidate for office, running for Parliament in 1984, 2000 and 2004, Ward 2 Councillor in 2004 and Mayor for Hamilton on numerous occasions. His campaign was centered on legalization of marijuana, but he also supported demalgimation and keeping City Hall in Jackson Square.

Larry Di Ianni: Incumbent Mayor of Hamilton. He was involved in a scandal involving his 2003 election campaign and was subsequently charged with violating the Municipal Elections Act. This turned many Hamiltonians against him and was cited as one of the reasons for his defeat.

Fred Eisenberger: Former Ward 5 city councillor and chairman of the Hamilton Port Authority. He unsuccessfully ran for mayor in 2000, finishing third behind Bob Wade and Bob Morrow.

Diane Elms: An iridology practitioner who ran a reform campaign, centered around fiscal mismanagement and lack of voter participation. She also stated that, if elected mayor, she would ask in Jesus' name, for God to forgive all those who misused their authority.

Gino Speziale: A tool and dye maker who ran a very small campaign. At most debates, people found that he supported Ms. Elms a majority of the time.

Steve Leach: An unknown candidate. The Hamilton Spectator poked fun at his lack of involvement in an editorial cartoon and commented "Steve Leach is so fringe, he's out of sight."

Martin Zuliniak: A pseudo-joke candidate who associated himself with the Rhinoceros Party, but had a non-joke platform of lower taxes, de-amalgamation and tourism promotion.

Results

|-
!rowspan="2" colspan="2" |Candidate
!colspan="3" |Popular vote
|- style="background-color:#fcfcfc;"
! Votes
! %
! ±%
|-
| style="background-color:#66023C;" |
| style="text-align:left;" | Fred Eisenberger
| style="text-align:right;" | 54,110
| style="text-align:right;" | 43.21%
| style="text-align:right;" | n/a
|-
| style="background-color:#FF0000;" |
| style="text-align:left;" | Larry Di Ianni (Incumbent)
| style="text-align:right;" | 53,658
| style="text-align:right;" | 42.84%
| style="text-align:right;" | −8.08%
|-
| style="background-color:#00008B;" |
| style="text-align:left;" | Diane Elms
| style="text-align:right;" | 9,459
| style="text-align:right;" | 7.55%
| style="text-align:right;" | n/a
|-
| style="background-color:#69359C;" |
| style="text-align:left;" | Michael Baldasaro
| style="text-align:right;" | 4,520
| style="text-align:right;" | 3.61%
| style="text-align:right;" | +1.76%
|-
| style="background-color:#5D8AA8;" |
| style="text-align:left;" | Gino Speziale
| style="text-align:right;" | 1,274
| style="text-align:right;" | 1.02
| style="text-align:right;" | n/a
|-
| style="background-color:#4F7942;" |
| style="text-align:left;" | Steve Leach
| style="text-align:right;" | 1,250
| style="text-align:right;" | 1.00
| style="text-align:right;" | n/a
|-
| style="background-color:#FCF75E;" |
| style="text-align:left;" | Martin S. Zuliniak
| style="text-align:right;" | 968
| style="text-align:right;" | 0.77
| style="text-align:right;" | n/a
|-
| style="text-align:right;background-color:#FFFFFF;" colspan="2" |Total votes
| style="text-align:right;background-color:#FFFFFF;" |126,986
| style="text-align:right;background-color:#FFFFFF;" |100%
| style="text-align:right;background-color:#FFFFFF;" |
|- 
| style="text-align:right;background-color:#FFFFFF;" colspan="2" |Registered voters
| style="text-align:right;background-color:#FFFFFF;" |340,941
| style="text-align:right;background-color:#FFFFFF;" |37.25%
| style="text-align:right;background-color:#FFFFFF;" |−0.72%
|- 
| style="text-align:left;" colspan="6" |Note: All Hamilton Municipal Elections are officially non-partisan.  Note: Candidate campaign colours are based on the prominent colour used in campaign items (signs, literature, etc.)and are used as a visual differentiation between candidates.
|- 
| style="text-align:left;" colspan="13" |Sources: Hamilton, Ontario, City Clerk's Office 
|}

City Council Elections

Ward One (Chedoke-Cootes)

|-
!rowspan="2" colspan="2" |Candidate
!colspan="3" |Popular vote
|- style="background-color:#fcfcfc;"
! Votes
! %
! ±%
|-
| style="background-color:#9b0000;" |
| style="text-align:left;" | Brian McHattie (incumbent)
| style="text-align:right;" | 5,068
| style="text-align:right;" | 62.88%
| style="text-align:right;" | +4.94%
|-
| style="background-color:#0000FF;" |
| style="text-align:left;" | Tony Greco
| style="text-align:right;" |2,676
| style="text-align:right;" |33.20%
| style="text-align:right;" | -
|-
| style="background-color:#8FC0A9;" |
| style="text-align:left;" | Fred Spencer
| style="text-align:right;" |316
| style="text-align:right;" |3.92%
| style="text-align:right;" | -
|-
| style="text-align:right;background-color:#FFFFFF;" colspan="2" |Total votes
| style="text-align:right;background-color:#FFFFFF;" |8,060
| style="text-align:right;background-color:#FFFFFF;" |100%
| style="text-align:right;background-color:#FFFFFF;" |
|- 
| style="text-align:right;background-color:#FFFFFF;" colspan="2" |Registered voters
| style="text-align:right;background-color:#FFFFFF;" |21,215
| style="text-align:right;background-color:#FFFFFF;" |37.99%
| style="text-align:right;background-color:#FFFFFF;" |
|- 
| style="text-align:left;" colspan="6" |Note: All Hamilton Municipal Elections are officially non-partisan.  Note: Candidate campaign colours are based on the prominent colour used in campaign items (signs, literature, etc.)and are used as a visual differentiation between candidates.
|- 
| style="text-align:left;" colspan="13" |Sources: Hamilton, Ontario, City Clerk's Office
|}

Brian McHattie, incumbent councillor, focused on his environmental activism and dedication to expanding student housing through Ward One, which includes McMaster University.
Barber Tony Greco presented himself as the establishment to McHattie, and picked up support from political fixtures such as former Hamilton regional chairman Terry Cooke.
Developer Fred Spencer, called the race an "eye-opener" and lamented the lack of student involvement.

Ward Two (Downtown)

|-
!rowspan="2" colspan="2" |Candidate
!colspan="3" |Popular vote
|- style="background-color:#fcfcfc;"
! Votes
! %
! ±%
|-
| style="background-color:#3FFF00;" |
| style="text-align:left;" | Bob Bratina (incumbent)
| style="text-align:right;" | 4,001
| style="text-align:right;" | 66.78%
| style="text-align:right;" | +30.04% Note 1
|-
| style="background-color:#313D5A;" |
| style="text-align:left;" | Judy MacDonald-Musitano
| style="text-align:right;" |1,424
| style="text-align:right;" |23.77%
| style="text-align:right;" | +17.75% Note 1
|-
| style="background-color:#5E0035;" |
| style="text-align:left;" | Dawn Lescaudron
| style="text-align:right;" |319
| style="text-align:right;" |5.32%
| style="text-align:right;" | -
|-
| style="background-color:#96C0B7;" |
| style="text-align:left;" | Haider Shaikh
| style="text-align:right;" |247
| style="text-align:right;" |4.12%
| style="text-align:right;" | -
|-
| style="text-align:right;background-color:#FFFFFF;" colspan="2" |Total votes
| style="text-align:right;background-color:#FFFFFF;" |5,991
| style="text-align:right;background-color:#FFFFFF;" |100%
| style="text-align:right;background-color:#FFFFFF;" |
|- 
| style="text-align:right;background-color:#FFFFFF;" colspan="2" |Registered voters
| style="text-align:right;background-color:#FFFFFF;" |19,782
| style="text-align:right;background-color:#FFFFFF;" |31.25%
| style="text-align:right;background-color:#FFFFFF;" |
|- 
| style="text-align:left;" colspan="6" |Note: All Hamilton Municipal Elections are officially non-partisan.  Note: Candidate campaign colours are based on the prominent colour used in campaign items (signs, literature, etc.)and are used as a visual differentiation between candidates.Note 1: Results compared to 2004 By-Election
|- 
| style="text-align:left;" colspan="13" |Sources: Hamilton, Ontario, City Clerk's Office
|}

Bob Bratina, the incumbent councillor with only two years on council after winning a 2004 by-election, focused this campaign on transparency, increased policing and improved Via Rail service in the city.
Judy MacDonald-Musitano, who also ran in the 2004 by-election, held as her campaign principles the enforcement of a mandatory balanced budget, improved affordable transit and removal of parking meters in the downtown core.
Dawn Lescaudron was a first-time candidate, and did not interact with local media for the duration of the campaign.
Haider Shaikh promoted lower taxes, increased infrastructure spending and attracting new investment.

Ward Three (Hamilton Centre)

|-
!rowspan="2" colspan="2" |Candidate
!colspan="3" |Popular vote
|- style="background-color:#fcfcfc;"
! Votes
! %
! ±%
|-
| style="background-color:#FF0000;" |
| style="text-align:left;" | Bernie Morelli (incumbent)
| style="text-align:right;" | 4,460
| style="text-align:right;" | 72.65%
| style="text-align:right;" | +5.17%
|-
| style="background-color:#FCC200;" |
| style="text-align:left;" | Sean Gibson
| style="text-align:right;" |1,679
| style="text-align:right;" |27.35%
| style="text-align:right;" | -
|-
| style="text-align:right;background-color:#FFFFFF;" colspan="2" |Total votes
| style="text-align:right;background-color:#FFFFFF;" |6,139
| style="text-align:right;background-color:#FFFFFF;" |100%
| style="text-align:right;background-color:#FFFFFF;" |
|- 
| style="text-align:right;background-color:#FFFFFF;" colspan="2" |Registered voters
| style="text-align:right;background-color:#FFFFFF;" |23,913
| style="text-align:right;background-color:#FFFFFF;" |26.63%
| style="text-align:right;background-color:#FFFFFF;" |
|- 
| style="text-align:left;" colspan="6" |Note: All Hamilton Municipal Elections are officially non-partisan.  Note: Candidate campaign colours are based on the prominent colour used in campaign items (signs, literature, etc.)and are used as a visual differentiation between candidates.
|- 
| style="text-align:left;" colspan="13" |Sources: Hamilton, Ontario, City Clerk's Office
|}

Bernie Morelli, a 16-year veteran of Hamilton, Ontario City Council, made public safety, new parks and reduced transit fees for seniors his campaign priorities.
Sean Gibson, the owner of The Barber Center, a school of hairdressing, organized youth and minorities to give them greater representation on council.

Ward Four (East Hamilton)

|-
!rowspan="2" colspan="2" |Candidate
!colspan="3" |Popular vote
|- style="background-color:#fcfcfc;"
! Votes
! %
! ±%
|-
| style="background-color:#FF7F00;" |
| style="text-align:left;" | Sam Merulla (incumbent)
| style="text-align:right;" | 5,005
| style="text-align:right;" | 63.04%
| style="text-align:right;" | +8.82
|-
| style="background-color:#C7EBF0;" |
| style="text-align:left;" | Dave Wilson
| style="text-align:right;" |2,396	
| style="text-align:right;" |30.18%
| style="text-align:right;" | -
|-
| style="background-color:#8B0000;" |
| style="text-align:left;" | Norm Bulbrook
| style="text-align:right;" |368
| style="text-align:right;" |4.63%
| style="text-align:right;" | -
|-
| style="background-color:#8CD867;" |
| style="text-align:left;" | Dave Banko
| style="text-align:right;" |171
| style="text-align:right;" |2.15%
| style="text-align:right;" | -
|-
| style="text-align:right;background-color:#FFFFFF;" colspan="2" |Total votes
| style="text-align:right;background-color:#FFFFFF;" |8,042
| style="text-align:right;background-color:#FFFFFF;" |100%
| style="text-align:right;background-color:#FFFFFF;" |
|- 
| style="text-align:right;background-color:#FFFFFF;" colspan="2" |Registered voters
| style="text-align:right;background-color:#FFFFFF;" |23,322
| style="text-align:right;background-color:#FFFFFF;" |34.48%
| style="text-align:right;background-color:#FFFFFF;" |
|- 
| style="text-align:left;" colspan="6" |Note: All Hamilton Municipal Elections are officially non-partisan.  Note: Candidate campaign colours are based on the prominent colour used in campaign items (signs, literature, etc.)and are used as a visual differentiation between candidates.
|- 
| style="text-align:left;" colspan="13" |Sources: Hamilton, Ontario, City Clerk's Office
|}

Ward Five (Red Hill)

|-
!rowspan="2" colspan="2" |Candidate
!colspan="3" |Popular vote
|- style="background-color:#fcfcfc;"
! Votes
! %
! ±%
|-
| style="background-color:#FF0000;" |
| style="text-align:left;" | Chad Collins (incumbent)
| style="text-align:right;" | 8,245
| style="text-align:right;" | 90.26%
| style="text-align:right;" | +15.06%
|-
| style="background-color:#440381;" |
| style="text-align:left;" | George Gamble
| style="text-align:right;" |890	
| style="text-align:right;" |9.74%
| style="text-align:right;" | -
|-
| style="text-align:right;background-color:#FFFFFF;" colspan="2" |Total votes
| style="text-align:right;background-color:#FFFFFF;" |9,444
| style="text-align:right;background-color:#FFFFFF;" |100%
| style="text-align:right;background-color:#FFFFFF;" |
|- 
| style="text-align:right;background-color:#FFFFFF;" colspan="2" |Registered voters
| style="text-align:right;background-color:#FFFFFF;" |24,937
| style="text-align:right;background-color:#FFFFFF;" |37.87%
| style="text-align:right;background-color:#FFFFFF;" |
|- 
| style="text-align:left;" colspan="6" |Note: All Hamilton Municipal Elections are officially non-partisan.  Note: Candidate campaign colours are based on the prominent colour used in campaign items (signs, literature, etc.)and are used as a visual differentiation between candidates.
|- 
| style="text-align:left;" colspan="13" |Sources: Hamilton, Ontario, City Clerk's Office
|}

Ward Six (East Mountain)

|-
!rowspan="2" colspan="2" |Candidate
!colspan="3" |Popular vote
|- style="background-color:#fcfcfc;"
! Votes
! %
! ±%
|-
| style="background-color:#002E63;" |
| style="text-align:left;" | Tom Jackson (incumbent)
| style="text-align:right;" | 8,479
| style="text-align:right;" | 79.70%
| style="text-align:right;" | +4.87%
|-
| style="background-color:#E30022;" |
| style="text-align:left;" | Nathalie Xian Yi Yan
| style="text-align:right;" |2,160	
| style="text-align:right;" |20.30%
| style="text-align:right;" | -
|-
| style="text-align:right;background-color:#FFFFFF;" colspan="2" |Total votes
| style="text-align:right;background-color:#FFFFFF;" |10,907
| style="text-align:right;background-color:#FFFFFF;" |100%
| style="text-align:right;background-color:#FFFFFF;" |
|- 
| style="text-align:right;background-color:#FFFFFF;" colspan="2" |Registered voters
| style="text-align:right;background-color:#FFFFFF;" |27,699
| style="text-align:right;background-color:#FFFFFF;" |39.38%
| style="text-align:right;background-color:#FFFFFF;" |
|- 
| style="text-align:left;" colspan="6" |Note: All Hamilton Municipal Elections are officially non-partisan.  Note: Candidate campaign colours are based on the prominent colour used in campaign items (signs, literature, etc.)and are used as a visual differentiation between candidates.
|- 
| style="text-align:left;" colspan="13" |Sources: Hamilton, Ontario, City Clerk's Office
|}

Ward Seven (Central Mountain)

|-
!rowspan="2" colspan="2" |Candidate
!colspan="3" |Popular vote
|- style="background-color:#fcfcfc;"
! Votes
! %
! ±%
|-
| style="background-color:#FF7F00;" |
| style="text-align:left;" | Scott Duvall
| style="text-align:right;" | 4,111
| style="text-align:right;" | 29.56%
| style="text-align:right;" | -
|-
| style="background-color:#51E5FF;" |
| style="text-align:left;" | Dennis Haining
| style="text-align:right;" | 2,554
| style="text-align:right;" | 18.36%
| style="text-align:right;" | -
|-
| style="background-color:#702632;" |
| style="text-align:left;" | Dave Shuttleworth
| style="text-align:right;" | 2,509
| style="text-align:right;" | 18.04%
| style="text-align:right;" | -
|-
| style="background-color:#FF003F;" |
| style="text-align:left;" | John Gallagher
| style="text-align:right;" | 1,281
| style="text-align:right;" | 9.21%
| style="text-align:right;" | +1.11%
|-
| style="background-color:#48A9A6;" |
| style="text-align:left;" | Mark DiMillo
| style="text-align:right;" | 1,179
| style="text-align:right;" | 8.48%
| style="text-align:right;" | -
|-
| style="background-color:#25291C;" |
| style="text-align:left;" | Mark Harrington
| style="text-align:right;" | 1,031
| style="text-align:right;" | 7.41%
| style="text-align:right;" | -
|-
| style="background-color:#F0E100;" |
| style="text-align:left;" | Tim Nolan
| style="text-align:right;" | 994
| style="text-align:right;" | 7.15%
| style="text-align:right;" | -
|-
| style="background-color:#274690;" |
| style="text-align:left;" | Mark-Alan Whittle
| style="text-align:right;" | 249
| style="text-align:right;" | 1.79%
| style="text-align:right;" | -
|-
| style="text-align:right;background-color:#FFFFFF;" colspan="2" |Total votes
| style="text-align:right;background-color:#FFFFFF;" |14,209
| style="text-align:right;background-color:#FFFFFF;" |100%
| style="text-align:right;background-color:#FFFFFF;" |
|- 
| style="text-align:right;background-color:#FFFFFF;" colspan="2" |Registered voters
| style="text-align:right;background-color:#FFFFFF;" |38,478
| style="text-align:right;background-color:#FFFFFF;" |36.93%
| style="text-align:right;background-color:#FFFFFF;" |
|- 
| style="text-align:left;" colspan="6" |Note: All Hamilton Municipal Elections are officially non-partisan.  Note: Candidate campaign colours are based on the prominent colour used in campaign items (signs, literature, etc.)and are used as a visual differentiation between candidates.
|- 
| style="text-align:left;" colspan="13" |Sources: Hamilton, Ontario, City Clerk's Office
|}

Ward Eight (West Mountain)

|-
!rowspan="2" colspan="2" |Candidate
!colspan="3" |Popular vote
|- style="background-color:#fcfcfc;"
! Votes
! %
! ±%
|-
| style="background-color:#FF0800;" |
| style="text-align:left;" | Terry Whitehead (Incumbent)
| style="text-align:right;" | 7,829
| style="text-align:right;" | 55.72
| style="text-align:right;" | +28.59%
|-
| style="background-color:#DD614A;" |
| style="text-align:left;" | Frank D'Amico
| style="text-align:right;" | 3,614
| style="text-align:right;" | 25.72
| style="text-align:right;" | -
|-
| style="background-color:#3ABEFF;" |
| style="text-align:left;" | Peter Martin
| style="text-align:right;" | 2,387
| style="text-align:right;" | 16.99
| style="text-align:right;" | +2.03%
|-
| style="background-color:#93C0A4;" |
| style="text-align:left;" | Wayne Boychuk
| style="text-align:right;" | 221
| style="text-align:right;" | 1.57
| style="text-align:right;" | +0.52%
|-
| style="text-align:right;background-color:#FFFFFF;" colspan="2" |Total votes
| style="text-align:right;background-color:#FFFFFF;" |14,190
| style="text-align:right;background-color:#FFFFFF;" |100%
| style="text-align:right;background-color:#FFFFFF;" |
|- 
| style="text-align:right;background-color:#FFFFFF;" colspan="2" |Registered voters
| style="text-align:right;background-color:#FFFFFF;" |32,996
| style="text-align:right;background-color:#FFFFFF;" |43.01%
| style="text-align:right;background-color:#FFFFFF;" |
|- 
| style="text-align:left;" colspan="6" |Note: All Hamilton Municipal Elections are officially non-partisan.  Note: Candidate campaign colours are based on the prominent colour used in campaign items (signs, literature, etc.)and are used as a visual differentiation between candidates.
|- 
| style="text-align:left;" colspan="13" |Sources: Hamilton, Ontario, City Clerk's Office
|}

Ward Nine (Upper Stoney Creek)

|-
!rowspan="2" colspan="2" |Candidate
!colspan="3" |Popular vote
|- style="background-color:#fcfcfc;"
! Votes
! %
! ±%
|-
| style="background-color:#0047AB;" |
| style="text-align:left;" | Brad Clark 
| style="text-align:right;" | 3,394
| style="text-align:right;" | 50.92%
| style="text-align:right;" | -
|-
| style="background-color:#B2D3A8;" |
| style="text-align:left;" | Phil Bruckler (Incumbent)
| style="text-align:right;" | 3,271
| style="text-align:right;" | 49.08%
| style="text-align:right;" | -4.72%
|-
| style="text-align:right;background-color:#FFFFFF;" colspan="2" |Total votes
| style="text-align:right;background-color:#FFFFFF;" |6,760
| style="text-align:right;background-color:#FFFFFF;" |100%
| style="text-align:right;background-color:#FFFFFF;" |
|- 
| style="text-align:right;background-color:#FFFFFF;" colspan="2" |Registered voters
| style="text-align:right;background-color:#FFFFFF;" |18,202
| style="text-align:right;background-color:#FFFFFF;" |37.14%
| style="text-align:right;background-color:#FFFFFF;" |
|- 
| style="text-align:left;" colspan="6" |Note: All Hamilton Municipal Elections are officially non-partisan.  Note: Candidate campaign colours are based on the prominent colour used in campaign items (signs, literature, etc.)and are used as a visual differentiation between candidates.
|- 
| style="text-align:left;" colspan="13" |Sources: Hamilton, Ontario, City Clerk's Office
|}

Ward Ten (Lower Stoney Creek)

|-
!rowspan="2" colspan="2" |Candidate
!colspan="3" |Popular vote
|- style="background-color:#fcfcfc;"
! Votes
! %
! ±%
|-
| style="background-color:#ED1C24;" |
| style="text-align:left;" | Maria Pearson (Incumbent)
| style="text-align:right;" | 5,784
| style="text-align:right;" | 75.07%
| style="text-align:right;" | +38.1%
|-
| style="background-color:#93A8AC;" |
| style="text-align:left;" | Mary Ray
| style="text-align:right;" | 1,414
| style="text-align:right;" | 18.35%
| style="text-align:right;" | -
|-
| style="background-color:#aaf442;" |
| style="text-align:left;" | Keith Beck
| style="text-align:right;" | 507
| style="text-align:right;" | 6.58%
| style="text-align:right;" | -
|-
| style="text-align:right;background-color:#FFFFFF;" colspan="2" |Total votes
| style="text-align:right;background-color:#FFFFFF;" |7,898
| style="text-align:right;background-color:#FFFFFF;" |100%
| style="text-align:right;background-color:#FFFFFF;" |
|- 
| style="text-align:right;background-color:#FFFFFF;" colspan="2" |Registered voters
| style="text-align:right;background-color:#FFFFFF;" |19,112
| style="text-align:right;background-color:#FFFFFF;" |41.32%
| style="text-align:right;background-color:#FFFFFF;" |
|- 
| style="text-align:left;" colspan="6" |Note: All Hamilton Municipal Elections are officially non-partisan.  Note: Candidate campaign colours are based on the prominent colour used in campaign items (signs, literature, etc.)and are used as a visual differentiation between candidates.
|- 
| style="text-align:left;" colspan="13" |Sources: Hamilton, Ontario, City Clerk's Office
|}

Ward Eleven (Glanbrook-Winona)

|-
!rowspan="2" colspan="2" |Candidate
!colspan="3" |Popular vote
|- style="background-color:#fcfcfc;"
! Votes
! %
! ±%
|-
| style="background-color:#FAF0BE;" |
| style="text-align:left;" | David Mitchell (Incumbent)
| style="text-align:right;" | 4,646
| style="text-align:right;" | 60.04%
| style="text-align:right;" | n/a Note 1
|-
| style="background-color:#41f4f4;" |
| style="text-align:left;" | Joseph Baiardo
| style="text-align:right;" | 1,949
| style="text-align:right;" | 25.19%
| style="text-align:right;" | -
|-
| style="background-color:#EEC8E0;" |
| style="text-align:left;" | Sergio Della Fortuna
| style="text-align:right;" | 1,143
| style="text-align:right;" | 14.77%
| style="text-align:right;" | -
|-
| style="text-align:right;background-color:#FFFFFF;" colspan="2" |Total votes
| style="text-align:right;background-color:#FFFFFF;" |7,845
| style="text-align:right;background-color:#FFFFFF;" |100%
| style="text-align:right;background-color:#FFFFFF;" |
|- 
| style="text-align:right;background-color:#FFFFFF;" colspan="2" |Registered voters
| style="text-align:right;background-color:#FFFFFF;" |19,488
| style="text-align:right;background-color:#FFFFFF;" |40.26%
| style="text-align:right;background-color:#FFFFFF;" |
|- 
| style="text-align:left;" colspan="6" |Note: All Hamilton Municipal Elections are officially non-partisan.  Note: Candidate campaign colours are based on the prominent colour used in campaign items (signs, literature, etc.)and are used as a visual differentiation between candidates.Note 1: Mitchell was acclaimed in 2003.
|- 
| style="text-align:left;" colspan="13" |Sources: Hamilton, Ontario, City Clerk's Office
|}

Ward Twelve (Ancaster)

|-
!rowspan="2" colspan="2" |Candidate
!colspan="3" |Popular vote
|- style="background-color:#fcfcfc;"
! Votes
! %
! ±%
|-
| style="background-color:#C32148;" |
| style="text-align:left;" | Lloyd Ferguson
| style="text-align:right;" | 3,549
| style="text-align:right;" | 37.07%
| style="text-align:right;" | -
|-
| style="background-color:#3A4E48;" |
| style="text-align:left;" | Aznive Mallett
| style="text-align:right;" | 2,629
| style="text-align:right;" | 27.46%
| style="text-align:right;" | -
|-
| style="background-color:#FEA82F;" |
| style="text-align:left;" | Ryan Hale
| style="text-align:right;" | 2,625
| style="text-align:right;" | 27.42%
| style="text-align:right;" | -
|-
| style="background-color:#FF2E00;" |
| style="text-align:left;" | John Rocchi
| style="text-align:right;" | 690
| style="text-align:right;" | 7.21%
| style="text-align:right;" | -
|-
| style="background-color:#86CD82;" |
| style="text-align:left;" | David Hodds
| style="text-align:right;" | 82
| style="text-align:right;" | 0.86%
| style="text-align:right;" | -
|-
| style="text-align:right;background-color:#FFFFFF;" colspan="2" |Total votes
| style="text-align:right;background-color:#FFFFFF;" |8,658
| style="text-align:right;background-color:#FFFFFF;" |
| style="text-align:right;" |
|- 
| style="text-align:right;background-color:#FFFFFF;" colspan="2" |Registered voters
| style="text-align:right;background-color:#FFFFFF;" |17,994
| style="text-align:right;background-color:#FFFFFF;" |43.44%
| style="text-align:right;" |
|- 
| style="text-align:left;" colspan="6" |Note: All Hamilton Municipal Elections are officially non-partisan.  Note: Candidate campaign colours are based on the prominent colour used in campaign items (signs, literature, etc.)and are used as a visual differentiation between candidates.
|- 
| style="text-align:left;" colspan="13" |Sources: Hamilton, Ontario, City Clerk's Office
|}

Ward Thirteen (Dundas)

|-
!rowspan="2" colspan="2" |Candidate
!colspan="3" |Popular vote
|- style="background-color:#fcfcfc;"
! Votes
! %
! ±%
|-
| style="background-color:#C32148;" |
| style="text-align:left;" | Russ Powers
| style="text-align:right;" | 2,667
| style="text-align:right;" | 34.33%
| style="text-align:right;" | -
|-
| style="background-color:#8AE9C1;" |
| style="text-align:left;" | Julia Kollek
| style="text-align:right;" | 2,404
| style="text-align:right;" | 30.95%
| style="text-align:right;" | -
|-
| style="background-color:#B0D0D3;" |
| style="text-align:left;" | Keith Sharp
| style="text-align:right;" | 1,855
| style="text-align:right;" | 23.88%
| style="text-align:right;" | -
|-
| style="background-color:#F7AF9D;" |
| style="text-align:left;" | Peggy Chapman
| style="text-align:right;" | 842
| style="text-align:right;" | 10.84%
| style="text-align:right;" | -
|-
| style="text-align:right;background-color:#FFFFFF;" colspan="2" |Total votes
| style="text-align:right;background-color:#FFFFFF;" |7,817
| style="text-align:right;background-color:#FFFFFF;" |
| style="text-align:right;" |
|- 
| style="text-align:right;background-color:#FFFFFF;" colspan="2" |Registered voters
| style="text-align:right;background-color:#FFFFFF;" |17,994
| style="text-align:right;background-color:#FFFFFF;" |43.44%
| style="text-align:right;" |
|- 
| style="text-align:left;" colspan="6" |Note: All Hamilton Municipal Elections are officially non-partisan.  Note: Candidate campaign colours are based on the prominent colour used in campaign items (signs, literature, etc.)and are used as a visual differentiation between candidates.
|- 
| style="text-align:left;" colspan="13" |Sources: Hamilton, Ontario, City Clerk's Office
|}

Ward Fourteen (Wentworth)

|-
!rowspan="2" colspan="2" |Candidate
!colspan="3" |Popular vote
|- style="background-color:#fcfcfc;"
! Votes
! %
! ±%
|-
| style="background-color:#FFBF00;" |
| style="text-align:left;" | Robert Pasuta
| style="text-align:right;" | 2,519
| style="text-align:right;" | 59.78%
| style="text-align:right;" | -
|-
| style="background-color:#32A287;" |
| style="text-align:left;" | Grant Maloney
| style="text-align:right;" | 1,695
| style="text-align:right;" | 40.22%
| style="text-align:right;" | -
|-
| style="text-align:right;background-color:#FFFFFF;" colspan="2" |Total votes
| style="text-align:right;background-color:#FFFFFF;" |4,274
| style="text-align:right;background-color:#FFFFFF;" |
| style="text-align:right;" |
|- 
| style="text-align:right;background-color:#FFFFFF;" colspan="2" |Registered voters
| style="text-align:right;background-color:#FFFFFF;" |11,682
| style="text-align:right;background-color:#FFFFFF;" |36.59%
| style="text-align:right;" |
|- 
| style="text-align:left;" colspan="6" |Note: All Hamilton Municipal Elections are officially non-partisan.  Note: Candidate campaign colours are based on the prominent colour used in campaign items (signs, literature, etc.)and are used as a visual differentiation between candidates.
|- 
| style="text-align:left;" colspan="13" |Sources: Hamilton, Ontario, City Clerk's Office
|}

Ward Fifteen (Flamborough)

|-
!rowspan="2" colspan="2" |Candidate
!colspan="3" |Popular vote
|- style="background-color:#fcfcfc;"
! Votes
! %
! ±%
|-
| style="background-color:#02C3BD;" |
| style="text-align:left;" | Margaret McCarthy (Incumbent)
| style="text-align:right;" | 3,657
| style="text-align:right;" | 58.83%
| style="text-align:right;" | +8.4%
|-
| style="background-color:#FDEE00;" |
| style="text-align:left;" | Judi Partridge
| style="text-align:right;" | 2,559
| style="text-align:right;" | 41.17%
| style="text-align:right;" | -
|-
| style="text-align:right;background-color:#FFFFFF;" colspan="2" |Total votes
| style="text-align:right;background-color:#FFFFFF;" |6,243
| style="text-align:right;background-color:#FFFFFF;" |
| style="text-align:right;" |
|- 
| style="text-align:right;background-color:#FFFFFF;" colspan="2" |Registered voters
| style="text-align:right;background-color:#FFFFFF;" |17,445
| style="text-align:right;background-color:#FFFFFF;" |35.79%
| style="text-align:right;" |
|- 
| style="text-align:left;" colspan="6" |Note: All Hamilton Municipal Elections are officially non-partisan.  Note: Candidate campaign colours are based on the prominent colour used in campaign items (signs, literature, etc.)and are used as a visual differentiation between candidates.
|- 
| style="text-align:left;" colspan="13" |Sources: Hamilton, Ontario, City Clerk's Office
|}

Public School Board Election

|-
!rowspan="2" colspan="2" |Candidate
!colspan="3" |Popular vote
|- style="background-color:#fcfcfc;"
! Votes
! %
! ±%
|-
| style="background-color:#B57EDC;" |
| style="text-align:left;" | Judith Bishop (incumbent)
!colspan="3" | Acclaimed
|-
| style="text-align:right;background-color:#FFFFFF;" colspan="2" |Total votes
| style="text-align:right;background-color:#FFFFFF;" |
| style="text-align:right;background-color:#FFFFFF;" |
| style="text-align:right;" |
|- 
| style="text-align:right;background-color:#FFFFFF;" colspan="2" |Registered voters
| style="text-align:right;background-color:#FFFFFF;" |
| style="text-align:right;background-color:#FFFFFF;" |
| style="text-align:right;" |
|- 
| style="text-align:left;" colspan="6" |Note: All Hamilton Municipal Elections are officially non-partisan.  Note: Candidate campaign colours are based on the prominent colour used in campaign items (signs, literature, etc.)and are used as a visual differentiation between candidates.
|- 
| style="text-align:left;" colspan="13" |Sources: Hamilton, Ontario, City Clerk's Office
|}

|-
!rowspan="2" colspan="2" |Candidate
!colspan="3" |Popular vote
|- style="background-color:#fcfcfc;"
! Votes
! %
! ±%
|-
| style="background-color:#f73e1e;" |
| style="text-align:left;" | Tim Simmons
| style="text-align:right;" | 1,492
| style="text-align:right;" | 39.79%
| style="text-align:right;" | -
|-
| style="background-color:#af1536;" |
| style="text-align:left;" | Michael Adkins
| style="text-align:right;" | 811
| style="text-align:right;" | 21.63%
| style="text-align:right;" | -
|-
| style="background-color:#037171;" |
| style="text-align:left;" | Alex Moroz
| style="text-align:right;" | 808
| style="text-align:right;" | 21.55%
| style="text-align:right;" | -
|-
| style="background-color:#6B0F1A;" |
| style="text-align:left;" | Ryan Sparrow
| style="text-align:right;" | 639
| style="text-align:right;" | 17.04%
| style="text-align:right;" | -
|-
| style="text-align:right;background-color:#FFFFFF;" colspan="2" |Total votes
| style="text-align:right;background-color:#FFFFFF;" |3,750
| style="text-align:right;background-color:#FFFFFF;" |
| style="text-align:right;" |
|- 
| style="text-align:right;background-color:#FFFFFF;" colspan="2" |Registered voters
| style="text-align:right;background-color:#FFFFFF;" |
| style="text-align:right;background-color:#FFFFFF;" |
| style="text-align:right;" |
|- 
| style="text-align:left;" colspan="6" |Note: All Hamilton Municipal Elections are officially non-partisan.  Note: Candidate campaign colours are based on the prominent colour used in campaign items (signs, literature, etc.)and are used as a visual differentiation between candidates.
|- 
| style="text-align:left;" colspan="13" |Sources: Hamilton, Ontario, City Clerk's Office
|}

|-
!rowspan="2" colspan="2" |Candidate
!colspan="3" |Popular vote
|- style="background-color:#fcfcfc;"
! Votes
! %
! ±%
|-
| style="background-color:#8DB600"|
| style="text-align:left;" | Ray Mulholland (incumbent)
| style="text-align:right;" | 3,196
| style="text-align:right;" | 58.78%
| style="text-align:right;" | -
|-
| style="background-color:#77ACA2;" |
| style="text-align:left;" | Christy Cowan
| style="text-align:right;" | 2,241
| style="text-align:right;" | 41.22%
| style="text-align:right;" | -
|-
| style="text-align:right;background-color:#FFFFFF;" colspan="2" |Total votes
| style="text-align:right;background-color:#FFFFFF;" |5,437
| style="text-align:right;background-color:#FFFFFF;" |
| style="text-align:right;" |
|- 
| style="text-align:right;background-color:#FFFFFF;" colspan="2" |Registered voters
| style="text-align:right;background-color:#FFFFFF;" |
| style="text-align:right;background-color:#FFFFFF;" |
| style="text-align:right;" |
|- 
| style="text-align:left;" colspan="6" |Note: All Hamilton Municipal Elections are officially non-partisan.  Note: Candidate campaign colours are based on the prominent colour used in campaign items (signs, literature, etc.)and are used as a visual differentiation between candidates.
|- 
| style="text-align:left;" colspan="13" |Sources: Hamilton, Ontario, City Clerk's Office
|}

|-
!rowspan="2" colspan="2" |Candidate
!colspan="3" |Popular vote
|- style="background-color:#fcfcfc;"
! Votes
! %
! ±%
|-
| style="background-color:#A5D8FF"|
| style="text-align:left;" | Ron English
| style="text-align:right;" | 2,639
| style="text-align:right;" | 53.75%
| style="text-align:right;" | -
|-
| style="background-color:#468189;" |
| style="text-align:left;" | Judy Kloosterman
| style="text-align:right;" | 2,271
| style="text-align:right;" | 46.25%
| style="text-align:right;" | -
|-
| style="text-align:right;background-color:#FFFFFF;" colspan="2" |Total votes
| style="text-align:right;background-color:#FFFFFF;" |4,910
| style="text-align:right;background-color:#FFFFFF;" |
| style="text-align:right;" |
|- 
| style="text-align:right;background-color:#FFFFFF;" colspan="2" |Registered voters
| style="text-align:right;background-color:#FFFFFF;" |
| style="text-align:right;background-color:#FFFFFF;" |
| style="text-align:right;" |
|- 
| style="text-align:left;" colspan="6" |Note: All Hamilton Municipal Elections are officially non-partisan.  Note: Candidate campaign colours are based on the prominent colour used in campaign items (signs, literature, etc.)and are used as a visual differentiation between candidates.
|- 
| style="text-align:left;" colspan="13" |Sources: Hamilton, Ontario, City Clerk's Office
|}

|-
!rowspan="2" colspan="2" |Candidate
!colspan="3" |Popular vote
|- style="background-color:#fcfcfc;"
! Votes
! %
! ±%
|-
| style="background-color:#00BFFF;" |
| style="text-align:left;" | Laura Peddle
| style="text-align:right;" | 2,499
| style="text-align:right;" | 37.55%
| style="text-align:right;" | -
|-
| style="background-color:#663854;" |
| style="text-align:left;" | Kathy Archer (incumbent)
| style="text-align:right;" | 2,408
| style="text-align:right;" | 36.18%
| style="text-align:right;" | -
|-
| style="background-color:#EEEFA8;" |
| style="text-align:left;" | Lorrie McKibbon
| style="text-align:right;" | 1,084
| style="text-align:right;" | 16.29%
| style="text-align:right;" | -
|-
| style="background-color:#7CC6FE;" |
| style="text-align:left;" | Matt Terry
| style="text-align:right;" | 664
| style="text-align:right;" | 9.98%
| style="text-align:right;" | -
|-
| style="text-align:right;background-color:#FFFFFF;" colspan="2" |Total votes
| style="text-align:right;background-color:#FFFFFF;" |6,655
| style="text-align:right;background-color:#FFFFFF;" |
| style="text-align:right;" |
|- 
| style="text-align:right;background-color:#FFFFFF;" colspan="2" |Registered voters
| style="text-align:right;background-color:#FFFFFF;" |
| style="text-align:right;background-color:#FFFFFF;" |
| style="text-align:right;" |
|- 
| style="text-align:left;" colspan="6" |Note: All Hamilton Municipal Elections are officially non-partisan.  Note: Candidate campaign colours are based on the prominent colour used in campaign items (signs, literature, etc.)and are used as a visual differentiation between candidates.
|- 
| style="text-align:left;" colspan="13" |Sources: Hamilton, Ontario, City Clerk's Office
|}

|-
!rowspan="2" colspan="2" |Candidate
!colspan="3" |Popular vote
|- style="background-color:#fcfcfc;"
! Votes
! %
! ±%
|-
| style="background-color:#99BADD;" |
| style="text-align:left;" | Lillian Orban (incumbent)
| style="text-align:right;" | 4,778
| style="text-align:right;" | 57.27%
| style="text-align:right;" | -
|-
| style="background-color:#AF4319;" |
| style="text-align:left;" | Judy Colantino
| style="text-align:right;" | 3,565
| style="text-align:right;" | 42.73%
| style="text-align:right;" | -
|-
| style="text-align:right;background-color:#FFFFFF;" colspan="2" |Total votes
| style="text-align:right;background-color:#FFFFFF;" |8,343
| style="text-align:right;background-color:#FFFFFF;" |
| style="text-align:right;" |
|- 
| style="text-align:right;background-color:#FFFFFF;" colspan="2" |Registered voters
| style="text-align:right;background-color:#FFFFFF;" |
| style="text-align:right;background-color:#FFFFFF;" |
| style="text-align:right;" |
|- 
| style="text-align:left;" colspan="6" |Note: All Hamilton Municipal Elections are officially non-partisan.  Note: Candidate campaign colours are based on the prominent colour used in campaign items (signs, literature, etc.)and are used as a visual differentiation between candidates.
|- 
| style="text-align:left;" colspan="13" |Sources: Hamilton, Ontario, City Clerk's Office
|}

|-
!rowspan="2" colspan="2" |Candidate
!colspan="3" |Popular vote
|- style="background-color:#fcfcfc;"
! Votes
! %
! ±%
|-
| style="background-color:#FFA700;" |
| style="text-align:left;" | Wes Hicks
| style="text-align:right;" | 4,410
| style="text-align:right;" | 53.13%
| style="text-align:right;" | -
|-
| style="background-color:#0047AB;" |
| style="text-align:left;" | Al Pierce (incumbent)
| style="text-align:right;" | 2,556
| style="text-align:right;" | 42.73%
| style="text-align:right;" | -
|-
| style="background-color:#A3C1AD;" |
| style="text-align:left;" | Sylvia Thomas
| style="text-align:right;" | 1,334
| style="text-align:right;" | 16.07%
| style="text-align:right;" | -
|-
| style="text-align:right;background-color:#FFFFFF;" colspan="2" |Total votes
| style="text-align:right;background-color:#FFFFFF;" |8,300
| style="text-align:right;background-color:#FFFFFF;" |
| style="text-align:right;" |
|- 
| style="text-align:right;background-color:#FFFFFF;" colspan="2" |Registered voters
| style="text-align:right;background-color:#FFFFFF;" |
| style="text-align:right;background-color:#FFFFFF;" |
| style="text-align:right;" |
|- 
| style="text-align:left;" colspan="6" |Note: All Hamilton Municipal Elections are officially non-partisan.  Note: Candidate campaign colours are based on the prominent colour used in campaign items (signs, literature, etc.)and are used as a visual differentiation between candidates.
|- 
| style="text-align:left;" colspan="13" |Sources: Hamilton, Ontario, City Clerk's Office
|}

|-
!rowspan="2" colspan="2" |Candidate
!colspan="3" |Popular vote
|- style="background-color:#fcfcfc;"
! Votes
! %
! ±%
|-
| style="background-color:#FF7F00;" |
| style="text-align:left;" | Robert Barlow
| style="text-align:right;" | 3,495
| style="text-align:right;" | 47.54%
| style="text-align:right;" | -
|-
| style="background-color:#00BFFF;" |
| style="text-align:left;" | John Davidson (incumbent)
| style="text-align:right;" | 2,587
| style="text-align:right;" | 35.19%
| style="text-align:right;" | -
|-
| style="background-color:#99C24D;" |
| style="text-align:left;" | Michael Gemmel
| style="text-align:right;" | 1,270
| style="text-align:right;" | 17.27%
| style="text-align:right;" | -
|-
| style="text-align:right;background-color:#FFFFFF;" colspan="2" |Total votes
| style="text-align:right;background-color:#FFFFFF;" |7,352
| style="text-align:right;background-color:#FFFFFF;" |
| style="text-align:right;" |
|- 
| style="text-align:right;background-color:#FFFFFF;" colspan="2" |Registered voters
| style="text-align:right;background-color:#FFFFFF;" |
| style="text-align:right;background-color:#FFFFFF;" |
| style="text-align:right;" |
|- 
| style="text-align:left;" colspan="6" |Note: All Hamilton Municipal Elections are officially non-partisan.  Note: Candidate campaign colours are based on the prominent colour used in campaign items (signs, literature, etc.)and are used as a visual differentiation between candidates.
|- 
| style="text-align:left;" colspan="13" |Sources: Hamilton, Ontario, City Clerk's Office
|}

|-
!rowspan="2" colspan="2" |Candidate
!colspan="3" |Popular vote
|- style="background-color:#fcfcfc;"
! Votes
! %
! ±%
|-
| style="background-color:#41BBD9;" |
| style="text-align:left;" | Shirley Glauser
| style="text-align:right;" | 6,031
| style="text-align:right;" | 62.86%
| style="text-align:right;" | -
|-
| style="background-color:#54457F;" |
| style="text-align:left;" | Bob Maton
| style="text-align:right;" | 1,921
| style="text-align:right;" | 20.02%
| style="text-align:right;" | -
|-
| style="background-color:#6DA34D;" |
| style="text-align:left;" | Peter Accadia
| style="text-align:right;" | 1,642
| style="text-align:right;" | 17.11%
| style="text-align:right;" | -
|-
| style="text-align:right;background-color:#FFFFFF;" colspan="2" |Total votes
| style="text-align:right;background-color:#FFFFFF;" |9,594
| style="text-align:right;background-color:#FFFFFF;" |
| style="text-align:right;" |
|- 
| style="text-align:right;background-color:#FFFFFF;" colspan="2" |Registered voters
| style="text-align:right;background-color:#FFFFFF;" |
| style="text-align:right;background-color:#FFFFFF;" |
| style="text-align:right;" |
|- 
| style="text-align:left;" colspan="6" |Note: All Hamilton Municipal Elections are officially non-partisan.  Note: Candidate campaign colours are based on the prominent colour used in campaign items (signs, literature, etc.)and are used as a visual differentiation between candidates.
|- 
| style="text-align:left;" colspan="13" |Sources: Hamilton, Ontario, City Clerk's Office
|}

|-
!rowspan="2" colspan="2" |Candidate
!colspan="3" |Popular vote
|- style="background-color:#fcfcfc;"
! Votes
! %
! ±%
|-
| style="background-color:#FF7F00;" |
| style="text-align:left;" | Jessica Brennan (incumbent)
| style="text-align:right;" | 4,548
| style="text-align:right;" | 78.81%
| style="text-align:right;" | -
|-
| style="background-color:#8FBC94;" |
| style="text-align:left;" | Tyler Rockliffe
| style="text-align:right;" | 1,223
| style="text-align:right;" | 20.02%
| style="text-align:right;" | -
|-
| style="text-align:right;background-color:#FFFFFF;" colspan="2" |Total votes
| style="text-align:right;background-color:#FFFFFF;" |5,771
| style="text-align:right;background-color:#FFFFFF;" |
| style="text-align:right;" |
|- 
| style="text-align:right;background-color:#FFFFFF;" colspan="2" |Registered voters
| style="text-align:right;background-color:#FFFFFF;" |
| style="text-align:right;background-color:#FFFFFF;" |
| style="text-align:right;" |
|- 
| style="text-align:left;" colspan="6" |Note: All Hamilton Municipal Elections are officially non-partisan.  Note: Candidate campaign colours are based on the prominent colour used in campaign items (signs, literature, etc.)and are used as a visual differentiation between candidates.
|- 
| style="text-align:left;" colspan="13" |Sources: Hamilton, Ontario, City Clerk's Office
|}

|-
!rowspan="2" colspan="2" |Candidate
!colspan="3" |Popular vote
|- style="background-color:#fcfcfc;"
! Votes
! %
! ±%
|-
| style="background-color:#8A3324;" |
| style="text-align:left;" | Karen Turkstra
| style="text-align:right;" | 4,180
| style="text-align:right;" | 50.84%
| style="text-align:right;" | -
|-
| style="background-color:#BCEDF6;" |
| style="text-align:left;" | Reg Woodworth (incumbent)
| style="text-align:right;" | 4,042
| style="text-align:right;" | 49.16%
| style="text-align:right;" | -
|-
| style="text-align:right;background-color:#FFFFFF;" colspan="2" |Total votes
| style="text-align:right;background-color:#FFFFFF;" |8,222
| style="text-align:right;background-color:#FFFFFF;" |
| style="text-align:right;" |
|- 
| style="text-align:right;background-color:#FFFFFF;" colspan="2" |Registered voters
| style="text-align:right;background-color:#FFFFFF;" |
| style="text-align:right;background-color:#FFFFFF;" |
| style="text-align:right;" |
|- 
| style="text-align:left;" colspan="6" |Note: All Hamilton Municipal Elections are officially non-partisan.  Note: Candidate campaign colours are based on the prominent colour used in campaign items (signs, literature, etc.)and are used as a visual differentiation between candidates.
|- 
| style="text-align:left;" colspan="13" |Sources: Hamilton, Ontario, City Clerk's Office
|}

Catholic School Board Election

French Public School Board Election

French Catholic School Board Election

See also
List of Hamilton, Ontario municipal elections

Notes

2006 Ontario municipal elections
2006